Oleksandr Pekanov (born 21 April 1980), is a Ukrainian strongman competitor.

Oleksandr was born 21 April 1980 in Chernihiv, Ukraine. In 2001, he graduated from Chernihiv State Institute of Economics and Management. After graduating from the institute, became a soldier (in the railway troops). From 2002 to 2004 he worked at customs. In 2007 at Arnold Strongman Classic 2007 he set a world record by deadlifting 471.5 kg.

Personal records
Bench press - 
Squat - 
Hummer Tire Deadlift -

External links
 Profile on www.strongliga.com

References 

1982 births
Living people
Sportspeople from Chernihiv
Ukrainian strength athletes